Respect is a positive feeling or action shown towards someone or something considered important.

Respect may also refer to:

Arts and entertainment

Music

Songs
 "Respect" (song), originally by Otis Redding in 1965, and made popular by Aretha Franklin in her 1967 version
 "Respect" (Alliance Ethnik song), 1995
 "Respect" (Joel Turner song), 2005
 "Respect", a song by The Notorious B.I.G. from his 1994 album Ready to Die
 "Respect", a song by Pink from her 2001 album Missundaztood
 "Respect", a song by Train from the 2001 album Drops of Jupiter

Albums
 Respect (Jimmy Smith album), 1967
 Respect (Daniel Johnston album), 1985
 Respect (Robyn Hitchcock album), 1993
 Respect (Shaquille O'Neal album), 1998
 Respect (Diana King album), 2002
 Respect (Lisa M. album), 2006
 Respect, a 1988 album by Miami Bass female rapper Anquette
 Respect, a 1994 album by Sinner
 Respect, a 2000 album by 4th Avenue Jones

Other arts and entertainment
 Respect (1996 film), a British television drama
 Respect (2021 American film), a biographical drama film about the life of Aretha Franklin
 Respect (2021 Marathi film)
 Respect (TV series), documentary series aired on independent television in the UK
 "Respect" (The Bill), two-part series finale of British police procedural drama The Bill
 Respect (UEFA campaign), a social responsibility programme run by UEFA
 Respect (magazine), an American hip hop culture annual
 Respekt, Czech weekly news magazine published since 1989

Organisations
 Respect (charity), a domestic violence charity in the UK
 Respect (Haiti), a political party in Haiti
 Respect Party, a former British political party

Other uses
 Respect agenda, a prominent policy of Tony Blair